The Mojave Kid is a 1927 American silent Western film directed by Robert N. Bradbury and starring Bob Steele, Lillian Gilmore and Buck Connors.

Cast
 Bob Steele as Bob Saunders
 Lillian Gilmore as Thelma Vaddez
 Buck Connors as Silent
 Bob Fleming as Big Olaf
 Jay Morley as Bull Dugan
 Theodore Henderson as Panamint Pete
 Nat Mills as Zeke Hatch

References

Bibliography
 Munden, Kenneth White. The American Film Institute Catalog of Motion Pictures Produced in the United States, Part 1. University of California Press, 1997.

External links
 

1927 films
1927 Western (genre) films
1920s English-language films
American black-and-white films
Films directed by Robert N. Bradbury
Film Booking Offices of America films
Silent American Western (genre) films
1920s American films